The Taipei Film Awards are given by the Taipei Film Festival to honor achievements in Taiwanese cinema. Winners are selected from Taiwanese films which are presented in the competition section at the festival.

Grand Prize winners

Film awards

Individual awards

Outstanding Artistic Contribution awards

Outstanding Contribution Award

Other prizes

Lifetime Achievement Award

Best Individual Achievement

Special Mention, Actress

Special Grand Award of the Year

Special Jury Award

Special Mention

Industry Award for Narrative Feature

Non-Narrative Feature, Jury Prize

Best Experimental Film

Documentary Special Prize

Creative Genre Film Award

Best Fictional Film-Video Award

Best Animated Film-Video Award

Industry Award for Short

Narrative Short – Jury Special Award

Best Animation Short

Animation Short – Special Mention

Audience's Choice Award (2nd and 3rd place)

Best Animation Directors Award

Pro-Film Industry Award, Promising Talent Award

Most Promising Director of the Year

Dedicative Independent Documentary Filmmaker Award

Independent Spirit Award of the Year

Best Technical Achievements

Award of Outstanding Technique of the Year

Best Documentary Photography

References

External links
 Taipei Film Festival official website 

Taiwanese film awards